The Andachtsjodler (English: Devotional yodel; also called: Sterzinger Andachtsjodler, Mettenjodler, Rauhnachtjodler, or Jodlerandacht) is an untexted spiritual yodeling song which originated in the Christmas mass of the South Tyrol in Austria. Today it is performed in both liturgical and secular contexts, especially in Bavarian-Austrian folk music.

History

The folklorist  opined that the yodel in its present form came into being at the end of the 18th or beginning of the 19th century. Records state that the song was still sung in 1830 at Christmas mass in Sterzing (South Tyrol) as an annex to a shepherd's song (Christmas carol).

It appeared at the onset of Cecilianism but soon became largely forgotten. It was rediscovered by the Berlin high school teacher Max Pohl (1869–1928) within the Wandervogel movement. Annette Thoma used the yodel in her  (German peasants' mass) (1933). The 'Salzburg Advent Singing' also contributed to the yodel's popularity, as it is sung by both the participants and the audience.

Score and chant

The notation follows the two-part version by folksong researcher Karl Liebleitner (1858–1942) from 1921, which corresponds to the Sterzing variant.

Performance

In more recent times, the devotional yodel is usually performed in three voices, often with instrumental accompaniment.

In some releases, the traditional yodeling lyrics are followed by a newly added four-stanza poem of unknown author.

It is unclear whether this additional text should be sung to the yodel melody or whether it has its own melody. In the "Liederkiste", a free online songbook, it is referred to as "Alternative Text".

Male choirs sometimes sing it in four parts to the yodel melody.

Poem example

Heut' in der Nacht
Hab' ich hoch am Berg gewacht,
Denn dort droben kann ich sein
Mit dem Herrgott ganz allein.

Heut' in der Nacht
Hab' ich hoch am Berg gedacht:
Unsere Welt wär' öd und leer
Wenn der Herrgott nicht wär.

Heut' in der Nacht
Hab' mein Herz ich aufgemacht,
Hab' dem Herrgott erzählt
Von dem Jammer auf der Welt.

Heut' in der Nacht
Hat er freundlich Trost mir 'bracht.
Drunten ruht das stille Tal
Droben Sternlein ohne Zahl.
Tonight                          
I kept watch high on the mountain,    
because up there I can be
all alone with the Lord God.

Tonight
I thought high on the mountain:
Our world would be desolate and empty
If it wasn't for the Lord God.

Tonight
I opened my heart, 
I told the Lord God about
the misery in the world.

Tonight
he kindly brought me comfort.
Below rests the quiet valley
up there little stars without number.

Literature 

 Karl, Werner, ed. (1974). Liederbuch für Bergsteiger (in German) (2nd ed.). Münich: Bergverlag Rother. p. 189. ISBN 3-7633-8006-X.
 Pauli, Keim (2001). Alte Oberbayerische Volkslieder (in German). Köln: Parkland. p. 294. .
 Mantinger, Brigette (2007). "Der Andachsjodler" (in German).  Vierteltakt: Das Kommunikationsinstrument des Oberösterreichischen Volksliedwerkes. 3: pp. 2.7–2.11 – via Forum oö Geschichte
 Schmidkunz, Walter; List, Karl; Fanderl, Wastl; eds. (1979). Das Leibhaftige Liederbuch: Alpenländische Liedersammlung (in German). Wolfenbüttel: Möseler. p. 41. .

Notes

References

External links
 Andachtsjodler: Wachauer Adventsingen 2019 (YouTube)
 Voice of Nature: Andachtsjodler (YouTube)
 Andachtsjodler: Salzburger Adventsingen
 Informal Performance in Ireland, starting at 1:30 (YouTube)
 Andachtsjodler im Liederprojekt von Carus und SWR2, retrieved 17 October 2017

Singing
Religious music
South Tyrol
Folk music
Yodelers
Austrian folk music